Lists of death metal bands can be found at:

 List of death metal bands, !–K, for bands beginning with !-9 through K
 List of death metal bands, L–Z, for bands beginning with L through Z

Lists of death metal bands